Army Men: Air Attack 2 (Army Men: Air Attack - Blade's Revenge in Europe for the PlayStation 2 version and Army Men: Air Combat - The Elite Missions for the GameCube version) is a third-person shooter video game developed and published by The 3DO Company for PlayStation, PlayStation 2 and GameCube.

Gameplay and premise
Following the events in Army Men: Air Attack and previous Army Men games, players control a helicopter in the Green Army against the Tan Army, working with character William Blade to defeat their enemies. Players can unlock abilities and weapons by collecting plastic. It features cooperative and competitive multiplayer modes. Players are accompanied by co-pilots, each of which has a special secondary weapon unique to them.

Reception

The PlayStation 2 version received "generally favorable reviews", and the PlayStation version received above-average reviews, while Air Combat - The Elite Missions received "generally unfavorable reviews", according to the review aggregation website Metacritic. Samuel Bass of NextGen said of the PlayStation version in its January 2001 issue, "This tiny plastic Apocalypse Now may be short-lived, but it's still one hell of a lot of fun." Five issues later, Jim Preston called the PS2 version "the best-looking Army Men game ever made, and it's actually pretty fun too. We're as surprised as you are."

2 Barrel Fugue of GamePro said of the PlayStation version, "Packaged with mediocre graphics and underwhelming sound, Army Men: Air Attack 2 isn't terrible, but it can't come close to those long summer days when all you needed was a sandbox and a little imagination." Later, Four-Eyed Dragon said of the PlayStation 2 version, "If you're looking for action-packed combat shooting in the skies---plastic style---sign up for a tour of duty with Air Attack 2. You won't be disappointed."

Notes

References

External links

2000 video games
Army Men
GameCube games
Helicopter video games
Multiplayer and single-player video games
PlayStation (console) games
PlayStation 2 games
Third-person shooters
Video game sequels
Video games developed in the United States